Haugh of Urr, is a village in the historical county of Kirkcudbrightshire in Dumfries and Galloway,  Scotland.

Description
The village is situated beside the River Urr. Scots haugh, from Old English halh, healh 'corner, nook' means river-meadow or a level piece of ground beside a stream. 'Urr' is from Cumbric or 'a border, boundary, limit'.

It has one public house, the Laurie Arms which incorporates a part-time Post Office, one Church (Church of Scotland), a Village Hall, a Scout hut, and a small village green. The village no longer has any shops. It used to have two shops, one of which included a petrol filling station, while the other included a full-time post office, which reduced to part-time in later years. The last shop closed in 2009. Hardgate is a nearby hamlet up the hill and the boundaries are indistinct. Agriculture and tourism are the mainstays of the local economy.  The village is known to locals as "The Haugh". The Australian suburb of Urrbrae was named after the village.

River Urr 
The River Urr is noted for salmon fishing. The river, also known as Urr Water originates at Loch Urr and flows for  southwards past Corsock, Glenlair, Auchendolly, Bridge of Urr, Haugh of Urr, and close to Dalbeattie, via Palnackie to the Solway Firth at Rough Firth.

Motte of Urr

The Motte of Urr, is the site of a motte-and-bailey castle. Today this medieval earthwork near the Haugh of Urr is said to be the most extensive bailey earthwork in Scotland. It lies beside the River Urr to the north west of Dalbeattie. It dates from the 12th century, and covers an area of about 2 ha (5 acres). In the present day, there are no excavations or walls. It is associated with Buittle Castle, dated to about 1230, which was destroyed early in the 14th century and belonged to Devorgilla and her husband John I de Balliol (founder of Balliol College, at Oxford University). Together they bore the future king John of Scotland.

List of listed buildings 
List of listed buildings in Urr, Dumfries and Galloway

References

List of United Kingdom locations: Ha-Hd

External links

Overview of the village http://www.scottish-places.info/towns/townfirst3245.html
Urr parish church https://web.archive.org/web/20070627091830/http://www.dlbteparishch.f9.co.uk/page15.html
Parish information http://www.genuki.org.uk/big/sct/KKD/Urr/
Vale of Urr https://web.archive.org/web/20070701083935/http://www.glenlair.org.uk/vale_of_the_urr.asp
Unpublished records for the parish of Urr in Kirkcudbrighshire http://donjaggi.net/galloway/index.html
River Urr http://www.glenlair.org.uk/river_urr.asp
Motte of Urr http://www.scottish-places.info/features/featurefirst8406.html
Motte of Urr https://web.archive.org/web/20070928195711/http://thereformation.info/motte.htm
Buittle Castle http://www.rcahms.gov.uk/pls/portal/newcanmore.details_gis?inumlink=65002

Villages in Dumfries and Galloway